Grébault-Mesnil is a commune in the Somme department in Hauts-de-France in northern France.

Geography
The commune is situated on the D86 road, some 8 miles (12 km) southwest of Abbeville.

Population

See also
Communes of the Somme department

References

Communes of Somme (department)